The St Kilda Pier in St Kilda, Victoria, Australia, is home to a colony of Little penguins, the St Kilda Pavilion, as well as the Marina of the Royal Melbourne Yacht Squadron.

It was first built in 1853 as a small private timber jetty by the St Kilda Pier and Jetty company, but destroyed the same year, and rebuilt by 1855 as a public pier. It was extended many times, until it became a 1944 ft pier with stone groins. A shelter at the beach end, a breakwater and an L shaped extension sheltering the St Kilda Yacht Club by the 1880s. Moorings for the Port Phillip Bay excursion steamers were added in 1893, and the Pavilion was added in 1904. The pier became a favourite destination for promenading, fishing, excursions and small boat moorings for much of the 20th century, as St Kilda became Melbourne's entertainment district and most popular beach.   

The breakwater had been built in timber, and in 1955 was replaced with a rubble stone one. In the 1970s, the timber pier was replaced with a concrete one, and the breakwater extended.  

Little penguins breeding amongst the rocks of the breakwater were first documented in 1974, with 100 altogether identified by 1989. They now number about 1200, and public viewing is a popular attraction. 

In 2017, with the pier nearing the end of its design life, Parks Victoria, the owner of bayside infrastructure in Victoria, announced a plan to replace the current one, with two options.

The pier remains a favourite destination for visitors to the St Kilda foreshore, with a walk to the end and back a popular activity.

References

Piers in Australia
Pier
Buildings and structures in the City of Port Phillip
Tourist attractions in Melbourne
Landmarks in Melbourne